Shane Atwell (18 May 1970 – 8 February 2012) was a Barbadian sailor. He competed in the Finn event at the 1988 Summer Olympics.

References

External links
 

1970 births
2012 deaths
Barbadian male sailors (sport)
Olympic sailors of Barbados
Sailors at the 1988 Summer Olympics – Finn
Place of birth missing